The Varini, Warni or Warini were one or more Germanic peoples who originally lived in what is now northeastern Germany, near the Baltic sea.

They are first named in the Roman era, and appear to have survived into the Middle Ages. It is proposed that in Old English they were called Werns or Warns.

Name and etymology

The name supposedly meant either "defenders" or "living by the river" (from the Indo-European root  "water, rain, river").

Attestations

Classical
The earliest mention of this tribe appears in Pliny the Elder's Natural History (published about 77 AD). He wrote that there were five Germanic races, and one of these were the Vandals. These included the Burgodiones, the Varinnae, the Charini (not known from any other record) and the Gutones (Goths).

Tacitus (about AD 56 – 120) gave the most information about the Varini in his Germania. He mentioned them as one of a group of remote Suevian peoples, living beyond (north and/or east of) the Semnones and Langobardi (who lived near the Elbe). He did not mention that they were Vandili.

{|
!style="width: 50%; vertical-align: top;"|(English translation)
!style="width: 50%; vertical-align: top;"|(Original Latin)
|-
| "Next come the Reudigni, the Aviones, the Anglii, the Varini, the Eudoses, the Suardones, and Nuithones who are fenced in by rivers or forests. 
| "Reudigni deinde et Aviones et Anglii et Varini et Eudoses et Suarines et [2] Nuitones fluminibus aut silvis muniuntur. 
|-
|None of these tribes have any noteworthy feature, except their common worship of Ertha [the Latin says Nerthus], or mother-Earth, and their belief that she interposes in human affairs, and visits the nations in her car. 
|nec quicquam notabile in singulis, nisi quod in commune Nerthum, id est Terram matrem, colunt eamque intervenire rebus hominum, invehi populis arbitrantur. 
|-
|In an island of the ocean there is a sacred grove, and within it a consecrated chariot, covered over with a garment. Only one priest is permitted to touch it. 
|est in insula Oceani castum nemus, dicatumque in eo vehiculum, veste contectum; [3] attingere uni sacerdoti concessum.
|-
|He can perceive the presence of the goddess in this sacred recess, and walks by her side with the utmost reverence as she is drawn along by heifers.
|is adesse penetrali deam intellegit vectamque bubus feminis multa cum veneratione prosequitur.
|-
|It is a season of rejoicing, and festivity reigns wherever she deigns to go and be received.
|laeti tunc dies, festa loca, quaecumque [4] adventu hospitioque dignatur.
|-
|They do not go to battle or wear arms; every weapon is under lock; peace and quiet are known and welcomed only at these times, till the goddess, weary of human intercourse, is at length restored by the same priest to her temple.
|non bella ineunt, non arma sumunt; clausum omne ferrum; pax et quies tunc tantum nota, tunc tantum amata, donec idem sacerdos satiatam [5] conversatione mortalium deam templo reddat.
|-
|Afterwards the car, the vestments, and, if you like to believe it, the divinity herself, are purified in a secret lake. Slaves perform the rite, who are instantly swallowed up by its waters.
|mox vehiculum et vestis et, si credere velis, numen ipsum secreto lacu abluitur. servi ministrant, quos statim idem lacus haurit.
|-
|Hence arises a mysterious terror and a pious ignorance concerning the nature of that which is seen only by men doomed to die.
|arcanus hinc terror sanctaque ignorantia, quid sit illud quod tantum perituri vident.
|-
|This branch indeed of the Suevi stretches into the remoter regions of Germany."
|Et haec quidem pars Sueborum in secretiora Germaniae porrigitur"
|-
|--Tacitus, Germania, 40, translated 1877 by Church and Brodribb.
|--Tacitus, Germania, 40.
|}

These describe the Viruni as being near the otherwise unknown Teutonoari. Gudmund Schütte suggested that this name is an error combining the Teutones and "Aoaroi", and would equate the later to the Varini (Ouarni) as a doubling-up error. Together these two peoples were surrounded by:
The Elbe to their west. Schütte (e.g. p. 34) reconstructs Ptolomy's intentions in such a way that the Langobards were living in this area.
A river called the Chalusus to the east, beyond which the surviving versions of Ptolemy's Geography name the Teutones and Avarni. Schütte (p. 44) proposes this to be another doubling-up of two peoples, caused by misunderstandings of copyists. West of them, in turn is another unknown river the "Suevos" and a people called the Aelvaeones.
Saxons to their north, between the Elbe and Chalusus rivers. Some scholars such as Matthias Springer believe the text originally said "Aviones". To the east of these Saxons over the Chalusus, are the Farodini (otherwise unknown).
The Semnones, a large Suevian people, lay to their south. Their territory stretches east of the Chalusus, as far as the Suevos.

The three accounts appear to describe a similar area, east of the Elbe. It is perhaps in the area of Mecklenburg, where one of the main rivers is called the Warnow and a town is called Warnemünde.

Ptolemy also plotted the position of a town named Virunum at 40°30' longitude and 55° latitude using his system. This was however east of the Chalusus river, between the "Suevus" and "Viadua" rivers, which both lay between the Chalusus and the Vistula according to him. The town  has been identified as somewhere near modern-day Drawsko Pomorskie.

Late antiquity
The Warini were mentioned by Procopius in the 6th century, implying that the Varini had a very large territory in his time. Procopius situates the  bordering the Franks, with only the river Rhine between them, but also stretching to the coast. Their king Hermegisclus had made a strategic alliance with the Frankish ruler Theudebert I (ruler Austrasia 533-547), marrying his sister Theudechild. However, in contrast he had engaged his son with the sister of the Anglian ruler. Before his death he expressed the wish to have his son married to his stepmother Theudechild instead. As a result when king Hermegisclus died, the Warinis compelled his son Radigis to marry his stepmother. The maiden, who is not named in the story, did not accept this, and crossed the North Sea with an army of 400 ships and 100.000 men, seeking retaliation. After a battle won by the Anglians, Radigis was caught hiding in a wood not far from the mouth of the Rhine and had no other choice than to marry his fiancée.

He also wrote in passing that when the Heruls (Eruli) had been defeated by the Lombards, some of them moved to Scandinavia (which he called Thule). When other Heruls sought to find them years later, they crossed the Danube (Ister), went through the lands of the Slavs (Sclaveni) and after a barren region, they came to the land of the Warni. After these Warni they passed through the land of the Danes, and then crossed the sea from there to Scandinavia, where they found them living with the Geats (Gautoi).

Others, however, question Procopius's reliability for this northern region. Modern scholars claim that the area north of the Rhine may have been under Frankish control during the greater parts of the 6th and 7th centuries, at least since the defeat of the Danish sea-king Hygelac in 526.

According to the chronicle of Fredegar the Varni or Warni rebelled against the Merovingian Franks in 594 and were bloodily defeated by Childebert II in 595 (the year he died) "so that few of them survived".

The Warini also appear in the title of a 9th-century legal codex, Lex Angliorum et Werinorum hoc est Thuringorum (Law of the Angles and Warini, that is, of the Thuringians), which has much in common with Frankish, Frisian and Saxon law codes.

Recent research suggests that they were part of a Thuringian federation, which dominated Northern Germany from Atilla's death in 453 to the middle of the 6th century when they were crushed by the Franks. Their military fame might explain why the names of the Warini and Thuringians have been mentioned in a much wider area, extending even beyond the Rhine. Their home country seems to have been the district between the rivers Saale and Elster, which was called Werenofeld (around Eisleben).

When the region east of the Elbe became Slavic-speaking, a group in this region continued to be called Warnabi, perhaps representing assimilated Varni.

The Warini are mentioned in the Anglo-Saxon poem Widsith as the Wærne or Werne.

The name Billing, mentioned in Widsith, might be related to the ancestors of the Saxon Billung-family.

See also
List of Germanic peoples
Värend, possible Warnic homeland

References

External links
A scholarly treatment by Charles Harrison-Wallace

 
Early Germanic peoples
Vandals